The maple leaf is the characteristic leaf of the maple tree. It is the most widely recognized as the national symbol of Canada.

History of use in Canada
By the early 1700s, the maple leaf had been adopted as an emblem by the French Canadians along the Saint Lawrence River.

Its popularity with French Canadians continued and was reinforced when, at the inaugural meeting of the Société Saint-Jean-Baptiste in 1834, the maple leaf was one of numerous emblems proposed to represent the society. Speaking in its favour, Jacques Viger, the first mayor of Montreal, described the maple as "the king of our forest; ... the symbol of the Canadian people."

The maple leaf slowly caught on as a national symbol: in 1868, it was included in the coat of arms of Ontario and the coat of arms of Quebec, and was added to the Canadian coat of arms in 1921. Historically, the golden maple leaf had represented Ontario, while the green maple leaf had represented Quebec. In 1867, Alexander Muir composed the patriotic "The Maple Leaf Forever", which became an unofficial anthem in English-speaking Canada. From 1876 until 1901, the leaf appeared on all Canadian coins, and remained on the penny after 1901. During the First World War, badges of the Canadian Expeditionary Force were often based on a maple leaf design. The use of the maple leaf as a regimental symbol extended from the 1800s, and Canadian soldiers in the Second Boer War were distinguished by a maple leaf on their sun helmets. In 1957 the maple leaf colour on the Canadian arms was changed from green to red – some maple leaves are commonly red even in spring as they bud and no seasonal colouring has been assigned heraldically.

The maple leaf became the central national symbol with the introduction of the Canadian flag (suggested by George F. G. Stanley and sponsored by  John Matheson) in 1965, which uses a highly stylized eleven-pointed maple leaf, referring to no specific species of maple. Earlier official uses of a maple leaf design often used more than 30 points and a short stem. The one chosen is a generic maple leaf representing the ten species of maple tree native to Canada – at least one of these species grows natively in every province. The maple leaf is used on the Canadian flag and by the Federal Government as a personification and identifier on its websites, as part of the government's wordmark.

The maple leaf is also used in logos of various Canadian-based companies (including Canadian subsidiaries of foreign companies and small local businesses) and the logos of Canadian sports teams. Examples include Air Canada, General Motors Canada, the Toronto Maple Leafs and Winnipeg Jets NHL franchises, the Toronto Blue Jays MLB franchise and the Toronto FC soccer club. Several national chains (e.g. McDonald's Canada, Wendy's Canada) use the maple leaf in place of a possessive apostrophe in their company logo, in order to have consistent branding across the country while complying with Quebec's Official Language Act (as the French language does not use this punctuation).

The maple leaf is considered a certification mark on product labels in Canada, equivalent to "Product of Canada" which requires 98% of the total direct costs of the product to be incurred in Canada.

Since 1979, the Royal Canadian Mint has produced gold, silver, platinum, and palladium bullion coins, which are officially known as Maple Leafs, as geometric maple leaves are stamped on them. The Trans Canada Highway uses a green maple leaf.

Other uses

The Italian city of Campobasso was known as "Canada City" or in a minor way "Maple Leaf City", since during the Second World War, Canadian troops invaded the city and freed it from the Germans. Moreover, the city has a huge variety of maples which can be found even in the streets.

The U.S. city of Carthage, Missouri, is nicknamed "America's Maple Leaf City."

The city of Chehalis, Washington, was known as "The Maple-Leaf City".

The mascot of Goshen College in Goshen, Indiana, is the Maple Leaf and the nickname for Goshen College sports teams is the Maple Leafs.

It is usually taken as one of the featured symbols on the emblem of the Pakistani province of Azad Jammu and Kashmir, which is not correct. The actual featured symbol is a Chinar leaf, with Chinar being the Persian/Turkish/Urdu name for the Oriental Plane (Platanus orientalis), a large broad leaved deciduous tree.

In Estonia and Lithuania, inexperienced drivers are obliged to have a green maple leaf sign visible on the vehicle, serving a similar function that a P-plate does in some other countries.

The maple leaf was also featured on the coat of arms of Sammatti, Finland.

References

External links

Leaf
National symbols of Canada
Leaves